Paula Frans Rumokoy (April 17, 1949 – January 16, 1993) was an Indonesian actress, model, and dancer who was active in the 1960s and 1970s. She along with Suzan Tolani earned the nickname of "most popular Indonesian star" in the 1970s.

Biography 

Paula Frans Rumokoy was born on 17 April 1949 in Tumaluntung, a village in Kauditan, North Minahasa. Her father was Frans Rumokoy; he had some Spanish ancestry.  She has a younger sister named Joyce Rumokoy.

Rumokoy spent her childhood in Amurang.  After graduating from high school, she and her sister started their careers as catwalk models at Manado.

Rumokoy's first film appearance was a supporting role in Djakarta-Hongkong-Macao (1968), after winning the Manado tourism queen contest in the same year. She again played supporting roles in her next two films Laki-laki Tak Bernama (1969) and Apa Jang Kau Tjari, Palupi? (1969).  Rumokoy then joined Eka Quarta Dance, a dance troupe led by Rima Melati in Jakarta.  During this period, she lived with Melati in her house at Wahid Hasyim Street, Jakarta.

After Laki-laki Tak Bernama was successful at the box office, director Wim Umboh asked Rumokoy to star in his next film Dan Bunga-bunga Berguguran. The film was released in 1970, raising Rumokoy's name as an actress.  She also earned a good response from film critics for bravely doing a bikini scene which at that time was considered taboo in Indonesian film industry.

Rumokoy married Indonesian politician Bobby Suhardiman (1952–2021) on 3 December 1970, they had one daughter named Yasmina Mesguita Mathilda. The couple were divorced on 6 December 1973.

Rumokoy died at her residence in Jatinegara, North Jakarta, on Saturday evening, January 16, 1993, due to lung cancer at the age of 43.
Her funeral was held at Tanah Kusir Cemetery on the next day.

Filmography 
During her thirteen-year career, Rumokoy acted in twenty-seven films. She was also a costume and set designer for two films.

Cast

Djakarta-Hongkong-Macao (1968)
Laki-Laki Tak Bernama (1969)
Apa Jang Kau Tjari, Palupi? (1969)
Dan Bunga-bunga Berguguran (1970)
Si Pitung (1970)
Tjinta di Batas Peron (1971)
Rakit (1971)
Brandal-Brandal Metropolitan (1971)
Banteng Betawi (1971)
Wajah Seorang Pembunuh (1972)
Di Antara Anggrek Berbunga (1972)
Dendam Si Anak Haram (1972)
Si Bongkok (1972)
Selamat Tinggal Kekasih (1972)
The Angry Man (1972)
Merintis Djalan Ke Sorga (1972)
The Great Lover (1973)
Ayah (1973)
Jangan Kau Tangisi (1974)
Dikejar Dosa (1974)
Gersang Tapi Damai (1977)
Petualang-Petualang (1977)
Petualang Cinta (1978)
Ratapan Anak Tiri II (1980)
Hidup Tanpa Kehormatan (1981)

Crew

Sesuatu yang Indah (1976)
Kembang-Kembang Plastik (1977)

Awards

References

External links 

1949 births
1993 deaths
Minahasa people
Indonesian female models
Indonesian film actresses
20th-century Indonesian actresses
Actresses from North Sulawesi